Interstate 80 (I-80) in the U.S. state of Indiana consists entirely of the following two highways:

 The Borman Expressway, from the Illinois state line to Lake Station, Indiana, running concurrently with I-94, U.S. Highway 6 (US 6), and a small portion of US 41.
 The Indiana Toll Road, from Lake Station to the Ohio state line, running concurrently with I-90. 

 Indiana
80
Transportation in Lake County, Indiana
Transportation in Porter County, Indiana
Transportation in LaPorte County, Indiana
Transportation in St. Joseph County, Indiana
Transportation in Elkhart County, Indiana
Transportation in LaGrange County, Indiana
Transportation in Steuben County, Indiana